The International Diocese is a diocese of the Anglican Church in North America, comprising 14 congregations in 6 American states, Colorado, Kentucky, New York, Oklahoma, Tennessee and Texas. The Diocesan Office is located in Carrollton, Texas. The International Diocese Congregations stretch from Texas to New York and also comprise mission fellowships.

The International Diocese originated from the fact that many congregations in the United States were under the authority of foreign Anglican churches. One of these was the Anglican Church of Kenya, of which Bill Atwood was a Suffragan Bishop at the All Saints Cathedral Diocese, in Nairobi, and of the Missionary Convocation of Kenya in the United States. Bill Atwood has been General Secretary of the Ekklesia society, an orthodox Anglican aggregation, since 2000, having left the Episcopal Church in 2006.

The International Diocese was a founding member of the Anglican Church in North America, in 2009, with Bill Atwood as their first bishop.

References

External links
International Diocese Official Website

Dioceses of the Anglican Church in North America
Anglican dioceses established in the 21st century
Anglican realignment dioceses